The Lee Konitz Quintet (also called Affinity) is an album by American jazz saxophonist Lee Konitz recorded in 1977 and released on the Chiaroscuro label.

Critical reception

Scott Yanow on Allmusic said "the two very complementary saxophonists take explorative solos on eight appealing chord changes, constantly challenging each other. Bob Mover would become much more individual within a few years but on this album it is very much like listening to a teacher and his prize student".

Track listing 
All compositions by Lee Konitz except where noted.
 "Affinity" – 4:14
 "All the Things You Are" (Jerome Kern, Oscar Hammerstein II) – 8:26
 "Hi Beck" (Billy Bauer) – 6:25
 "Waltz for Debbie" (Bill Evans) – 3:13
 "Lennie-Bird" (Lennie Tristano) – 7:43
 "Solar" (Miles Davis) – 3:26
 "I Didn't Know About You" (Duke Ellington, Bob Russell) – 7:20
 "It's You" – 7:42

Personnel 
 Lee Konitz – alto saxophone
 Bob Mover – alto saxophone
 Ben Aranov – piano
 Mike Moore – bass
 Jim Madison – drums

References 

Lee Konitz albums
1977 albums
Chiaroscuro Records albums